Myrna Pérez (born 1974) is an American lawyer serving as a United States circuit judge of the United States Court of Appeals for the Second Circuit. She was previously the director of voting rights at the Brennan Center for Justice.

Early life and education 
Pérez is a native of San Antonio, Texas. She earned a Bachelor of Arts degree from Yale University in 1996, a Master of Public Policy from the Harvard Kennedy School in 1998, and a Juris Doctor from the Columbia Law School in 2003.

Career 
Pérez began her career as a policy analyst in the Government Accountability Office. She was later a law clerk for judges Anita B. Brody of the United States District Court for the Eastern District of Pennsylvania and Julio M. Fuentes of the United States Court of Appeal for the Third Circuit. Pérez joined the Brennan Center for Justice in 2006 and left in 2021 after being confirmed as a federal judge. She has been a lecturer at Columbia Law School and an adjunct professor at the New York University School of Law. Perez co-authored reports about voter purges in 2008 and 2018. Pérez also authored reports on wait times at polling locations for people of color, the impact of resource allocation on election day, and voter identification.

Notable cases 

In 2006, Perez represented the Idaho Aids Foundation in a suit against the Idaho Housing and Finance Association regarding the cut-off of funding for the former’s programming.

In 2007, Perez was part of the legal team participating in a suit involving the voting rights of convicted felons in Alabama.

Perez participated as amicus in a suit challenging the at-large voting system set up by the Village of Port Chester as violative of the Voting Rights Act by diluting Hispanic votes.

In 2016, Perez served as counsel for a number of plaintiff groups challenging Texas SB 14, which required photo ID in order to vote. Perez successfully persuaded the Fifth Circuit to strike down the law. 

In 2020, Perez represented plaintiffs challenging restrictions placed on felon re-enfranchisement by the Florida legislature, Jones v. Governor of Fla.

Also in 2020, Perez defended the state of Pennsylvania’s mail-in-voting scheme for the 2020 presidential elections.

Federal judicial service 
On June 15, 2021, President Joe Biden announced his intent to nominate Pérez to serve as a United States circuit judge of the United States Court of Appeals for the Second Circuit to the seat vacated by Judge Denny Chin, who assumed senior status on June 1, 2021. On July 14, 2021, a hearing on her nomination was held before the Senate Judiciary Committee. During her hearing, Pérez was questioned about her voting rights advocacy, including an article she had written called "The GOP Campaign to Make Elections Less Free." Pérez said that she didn't write or approve the article headline, and pledged to set aside her past advocacy work if confirmed to the court. On August 5, 2021, her nomination was reported out of committee by a 12–10 vote. On October 21, 2021, the United States Senate invoked cloture on her nomination by a 51–48 vote. On October 25, 2021, her nomination was confirmed by a 48–43 vote. She received her judicial commission on November 12, 2021.

Personal life 
Pérez married Mark Muntzel, a mechanical engineer, in 2007.

See also 
 List of Hispanic/Latino American jurists

References

External links

 
 Biography at the Brennan Center for Justice

1974 births
Living people
21st-century American women lawyers
21st-century American judges
21st-century American lawyers
21st-century American women judges
Columbia Law School alumni
Columbia Law School faculty
Harvard University alumni
Hispanic and Latino American judges
Hispanic and Latino American lawyers
Judges of the United States Court of Appeals for the Second Circuit
New York University School of Law faculty
People from San Antonio
United States court of appeals judges appointed by Joe Biden
Yale University alumni